All Over Town is a 1937 American comedy film directed by James W. Horne and starring Olsen and Johnson.

Cast
Ole Olsen as Olsen
Chic Johnson as Johnson
Mary Howard as Joan Eldridge
Harry Stockwell as Don Fletcher
Franklin Pangborn as The Costumer
James Finlayson as MacDougal
Eddie Kane as William Bailey
Stanley Fields as Slug
D'Arcy Corrigan as Davenport
Lew Kelly as Martin
John Sheehan as McKee
Earle Hodgins as Barker
Gertrude Astor as Mamie
Blanche Payson as Mother Wilson, Landlady
Otto Hoffman as Peter Stuyvesant "Pete" Phillips
Fred Kelsey as Inspector Murphy
Charlie Becker as Bit Part (uncredited)
Alan Ladd

External links

1937 films
American comedy films
1937 comedy films
American black-and-white films
Films directed by James W. Horne
1930s English-language films
1930s American films